Chips and dip is a dish consisting of chips (crisps) served with dips. Chips used include potato chips, tortilla chips, corn chips, bean chips, vegetable chips, pita chips, plantain chips and others. Crackers are also sometimes used, as are crudités, which are whole or sliced raw vegetables. Various types of dips are used to accompany various types of chips. It may be served as a party dish, appetizer, hors d'oeuvre, or snack.

Chips and dip gained significant popularity in the United States during the 1950s, in part due to a Lipton advertising campaign for their French onion dip recipe, sometimes referred to as "California dip".  Specialized trays and serving dishes designed to hold both chips and dip were created during this time. Chips and dip are frequently served during the Super Bowl American football game in the United States. National Chip and Dip Day occurs annually in the U.S. on March 23.

History

United States
The popularity of chips and dip significantly increased in the United States during the 1950s, beginning circa 1954, due to changes in styles of entertaining in the suburbs and also due to a Lipton advertising campaign based upon using Lipton's instant dehydrated onion soup mix to prepare dip. The advertising campaign occurred on television and in supermarket display advertising, and promoted mixing the soup mix with sour cream or cream cheese to create a dip, to be served with potato chips or crudités. This dip began to be called California Dip. The advertising campaign realized significant success, and new, similar dip products were quickly developed thereafter. During this time, unique platters designed for chips and dip service were created that allowed for the containment of several types of chips, and service variations were devised that included serving the dip in a bread bowl or hollowed-out fruit.

Chips and dip are a popular food during the annual Super Bowl game in the United States. Eighty-five percent of Americans eat potato chips.

With corn-based chips

Chips and salsa, typically served using tortilla or corn chips, is a common type of chips and dip dish that gained significant popularity in the United States in the late 1980s. Chips and guacamole, also typically served with corn-based chips is another type, as well as chips and bean dip. Seven-layer dip and tortilla chips is another corn-based chip combination, as is chile con queso, an appetizer or side dish of melted cheese and chili pepper typically served in Tex-Mex restaurants as a sauce for nachos.

Double dipping

Double-dipping involves biting a chip and then re-dipping it into a dip, which some people disapprove of, while others are indifferent. Double-dipping ostensibly transfers bacteria from a person's mouth into a dip, which can then be transferred to other consumers' mouths. The term "double dipping," although it had existed since at least the mid twentieth century, was popularized in the 1993 Seinfeld episode "The Implant". 

In March 2013, Tostitos, a U.S. brand of tortilla chips and dips, hired the Ketchum communications agency to perform a survey concerning double dipping that polled over 1,000 Americans. The survey found that 46% of male participants double-dip at a party, compared to 32% of females. 54% stated that they would not consume dip after seeing another person double-dip, and 22% stated that they did not care. 25% stated that they would verbally object to a person caught double-dipping.

A study performed by the Department of Food Science and Human Nutrition at Clemson University claimed that three to six instances of double-dipping "would transfer about 10,000 bacteria from the eater’s mouth to the remaining dip," which corresponds with "about 50-100 bacteria from one mouth to another, in every bite." The study's conclusion recommended that double-dipping should, in their opinion, be curtailed, including tips to prevent it from occurring. The pH of the dip also affects the bacterial growth; higher acidity reduces the bacteria in the dip over time.

A segment on MythBusters in 2009 tested how much bacteria is transferred during the process of double-dipping, finding that there is a transfer but that it, "adds only a few more microbes".

National Chip and Dip Day

National Chip and Dip Day occurs in the United States annually on March 23. Tostitos-brand tortilla chips, a major U.S. brand, observed the day in 2015 by providing coupons for free dip for interested customers named "Chip".

In popular culture
Double-dipping was used as a plot point in the Seinfeld episode "The Implant". One of the main characters, George, argues at a funeral reception with his girlfriend's brother (Timmy) when he is accused of double-dipping a chip. This episode inspired the 2009 segment on MythBusters.

In the Mad Men episode "Red in the Face", Pete Campbell exchanges one of two identical chip and dip serving dishes given as wedding presents for a rifle.

See also

 Clam dip
 French onion dip
 List of dips
 List of potato dishes
 List of snack foods

References

Further reading
 
 Chip and dip tray U.S. patent. Publication number: US6152302 A.

External links

 Ray, Rachael (January 26, 2015). "7 'pass me the chips and dip' recipes". AOL.

Snack foods
Dips (food)
American cuisine
Food combinations